Sir Francis Chamberlain (1561–1570) was Governor of Guernsey.

References

1561 births
1570 deaths
Governors of British Overseas Territories and Crown Dependencies
Guernsey people